The 2011 Nigerian Senate election in Katsina State was held on April 9, 2011, to elect members of the Nigerian Senate to represent Katsina State. Abdul Yandoma representing Katsina North, Abu Ibrahim representing Katsina South and Ahmed Sani Stores representing Katsina Central all won on the platform of Congress for Progressive Change.

Overview

Summary

Results

Katsina North 
Congress for Progressive Change candidate Abdul Yandoma won the election, defeating other party candidates.

Katsina South 
Congress for Progressive Change candidate Abu Ibrahim won the election, defeating other party candidates.

Katsina Central 
CPC candidate Ahmed Sani Stores won the election, defeating party candidates.

References 

Katsina State Senate elections
Katsina State senatorial elections
Katsina State senatorial elections